Country Club is the debut studio album of American country music artist Travis Tritt, released in 1990 by Warner Bros. Records. The tracks "Country Club", "I'm Gonna Be Somebody", "Help Me Hold On", "Drift Off to Dream", and "Put Some Drive in Your Country" were released as singles. Of these, "Help Me Hold On" was a Number One hit on the Billboard Hot Country Singles & Tracks (now Hot Country Songs) charts; all the other singles except for "Put Some Drive in Your Country" reached Top Ten.

Track listing

Personnel
As listed in liner notes.

Musicians
 Chris Austin – banjo (10)
 Sam Bacco – timpani (5, 7), percussion (7, 9), suspended cymbal (9)
 Mike Brignardello – bass guitar
 Gregg Brown – acoustic guitar (4)
 Larry Byrom – acoustic guitar (except 3), slide guitar (3, 6, 8), electric guitar solo (4)
 Wendell Cox – electric guitar solo (2)
 Terry Crisp – pedal steel guitar (1, 5, 6, 8, 10)
 Jerry Douglas – Dobro (9)
 Paul Franklin – pedal steel guitar (2, 4, 6, 7, 8), lap steel guitar (2)
 Gregg Galbraith – electric guitar (1, 5, 6, 8, 10)
 Jack Holder – electric guitar (2)
 Dennis Locorriere – backing vocals (1, 8)

 Dana McVicker – backing vocals (1, 2, 3, 4, 9, 10)
 Edgar Meyer – double bass (7, 9)
 Mark O'Connor – fiddle (except 3)
 Bobby Ogdin – piano (2, 3, 7, 9), keyboards (2, 3)
 Mike Rojas – piano (1, 4, 5, 6, 7, 8, 10)
 Jim "Jimmy Joe" Ruggiere – harmonica (1-6, 8, 10)
 Travis Tritt – lead vocals
 Steve Turner – drums, percussion (2, 8, 9), folding chair (10)
 Billy Joe Walker Jr. – electric guitar (3, 7), acoustic guitar (9)
 Kent Wells – electric guitar (4)
 Terri Williams – backing vocals (9)
 Dennis Wilson – backing vocals (5, 10)
 Curtis Young – backing vocals (5, 10)
 Reggie Young – electric guitar (2, 3, 4, 7, 9)

Technical
 Gregg Brown – producer
 Robert Charles – engineer
 Carlos Grier – digital editing
 Scott Gunter – engineer
 Chris Hammond – recording (2, 3, 7, 9), engineer, mixing (3, 4, 7, 9, 10)
 John Hampton – mixing (2)
 Scott Hendricks – mixing (1, 5, 6, 8)
 Daniel Johnston – engineer
 Patrick Kelly – engineer
 Julian King – engineer
 Mark Nevers – engineer
 Gary Paczosa – engineer
 Mike Poole – recording (1, 4, 5, 6, 8, 10)
 Denny Purcell – mastering
 Dave Sinko – engineer
 Carry Summers – engineer

Charts

Weekly charts

Year-end charts

Certifications

References

1990 debut albums
Travis Tritt albums
Warner Records albums